was one of the most celebrated professional Go players and teachers of the game of Go in the twentieth century in Japan.

Biography 
He earned the nickname "the Prodigy" after winning a knockout tournament. He defeated eight opponents from the Kiseisha in a row during 1928. He played a celebrated match with then retiring Honinbō Shūsai. The Nobel Prize winning author Kawabata Yasunari used this game in his novel "The Master of Go". In 1954 he suffered a cerebral hemorrhage, but soon recovered. His condition came back in 1964, after which he retired from professional play. He was given the Okura Prize in 1967. 

Segoe Kensaku, a friend and rival of Kitani, nicknamed him "the Great Kitani" due to his extraneous efforts relating to Go.

Relationship with Go Seigen 
Kitani was a young prodigy who quickly attracted attention after the founding, in 1924, of the Nihon Ki-in. He became a great rival and friend of Go Seigen after the latter was brought to Japan from China.

Go and Kitani were the vanguard of the Shinfuseki or "New Opening" theory, a period roughly 1933-6 which saw great innovations in Go opening theory.

In 1939, Go Seigen and Kitani played in the Kamakura jubango, the most celebrated jubango of the century. It ended in Go Seigen's decisive victory. Kitani's career never quite recovered; he was also hampered by bad health, in the form of a heart condition. He was later noted for a style of spectacular idiosyncrasy, with great emphasis on secure territory.

Go and Kitani later lived only few minutes apart by walk, and Go Seigen's daughters studied Go in Kitani Dojo's amateur branch for children. Kitani had his stroke when he was chatting with Go. Kitani died six months after.

Izumi Kobayashi, Kitani's granddaughter and a top female Go player, married Cho U, the student of Go's student Rin Kaiho.

Kitani dojo
Kitani was subsequently noted as the most prolific teacher ever of future professional players. The Kitani dojo, which began to flourish after 1945 in the Kitani house in the countryside, was in practical terms run by his wife, produced a whole generation of top players who would dominate Japanese go from the early 1970s to mid-1990s.  His own daughter Reiko (1939–1996) reached 6 dan and won the All-Japan Women's Championship several times, and married one of his best students, Koichi Kobayashi.  Their child, Izumi Kobayashi, Kitani's granddaughter, is now one of Japan's current leading female players.  At the time of his death, he had taught over 60 students, 40 of whom went on to become professionals. The total dan rank of all his students add up to over 250.

Promotion Record

Titles & runners-up

References

External links 
 Broken Link: Interview with Tsuchida
 alternative location Tsuchida/Kitani article
 Gobase page on Kitani Minoru
 Sensei’s Library on Kitani Minoru
 Sensei’s Library on the Kitani dojo

1909 births
1975 deaths
People from Kobe
Japanese Go players